Pelecinellidae is formerly treated as the subfamily Leptofoeninae within pteromalid wasp containing the largest known members of the Chalcidoidea. They also, like many of the smaller pteromalids, are brilliantly metallic.

The subfamily contains only two genera, Doddifoenus (with three species) and Leptofoenus (with five extant species).

The first Leptofoeninae species known from the fossil record, Leptofoenus pittfieldae, was described in 2009 by Dr. Michael Engel from a specimen discovered in Dominican amber.

References 

Pteromalidae